Hakauata is an island in Tonga. It is located within the Ha'apai Group in the center of the country, to northeast of the national capital of Nukualofa.

See also

List of lighthouses in Tonga

References

Islands of Tonga
Haʻapai
Lighthouses in Tonga